Ulania is a Union of Mehendiganj Upazila in the District and Division of Barisal, Bangladesh.

In Ulania town there are the ancient ruins of the palaces, mosques of a local Lord (called Jamidar in Bengali). 'The Dark House' (called Ondho Kutir in Bengali) which is believed to be the house where Jamidars' brought rebels who were against them and let them starve until their death. Strong figures such as Asad Chowdhury (a prominent poet), Abdul Gaffar Choudhury (writer of Amar Bhaier Rokte Rangano), Wahed Reza Chowdhury (one of the leader of Khilafat Movement)  and many more creative faces were born in this locality.

Geography
It has total area 22.50 km². The town is located beside the Sultani River linked from the Meghna river in the north to the Tentulia River in the south.

The annual monsoon rains from July to September is both a blessing and a curse for the people of Bangladesh. Not enough has been done to rehabilitate the affected people or stop the erosion, compelling locals to help each other with their limited resources. It's not just the poor who are affected by the floods.
In the last 300 years, the feudal landlord (Zamindar) of Ulania of Mehendigonj built an estate of 100 magnificent architectural buildings which are also under the threat of Meghna erosion.

Demographics
At the 2001 Bangladesh census, Ulania had a population of 36000. Males constituted 18,572 of the population, and females 17,428. Ulania had an average literacy rate of 75% (7+ years), against the national average of 60%.

Administration

Ulania has 13 villages, 13 mouzas, 4 bazars, 2 waterbodies. Every five year the election take place to elect local government heads known as chairman. The lower branch of chairman are called members.
Maheb Miah is the current chairman of Ulania Union. He was elected on 23 January 2009 in 9 wards. He has 13 members to work with him in his cabinet in which 9 are male members and 3 are female members.
There are 19,605 of total voters in which 10,161 are male and 9,444 are female voters.

Villages
 Asha
 Balia
 Harni
 Hassanpur
 Hogultory
 Lalganj
 Mollikpur
 Nayakhali
 Nayonpur
 Purboshatti
 Rajapur
 Sultani
 Soldi
 Palpara
 Ulania: The capital of the union is located beside a canal adjacent to Ulania.

Bazaars
 Hazir Hut: Organised every Friday, Sunday and Wednesday and is the smallest hut than any other. It starts at around 4pm and ends at 7pm. People who mainly lives in Sultani are the main customers.
 Lalganj Hut:
 Master Hut
 Ali Gonj Hut
 Ulania Hut: The main hut organised every Monday and Thursday. The busiest day is Monday. People from every villages gather in Ulania from afternoon until midnight. Since this is the second biggest town of Mehendiganj after Patarhat so sellers and customers come from every unions.

Transport
The main transport used by the local people to travel one village to another village is rickshaw, bicycle, motorbikes etc. In the main roads people usually use auto rickshaw (known as tempo by the local people) to travel one place to another place faster. Motorbikes are also used as a term of transport for carrying passengers as well. Since this place is an island – ship, trawlers, speedboats, river liners (known as launch লঞ্চ) are the main transports to travel into various cities. Everyday lunch arrives in Mollikpur port & Sultani port to exchange passengers. Passengers may need to take trawlers to go to Sultani port because there is no road that will take you to the port.

Amenities
To make life comfortable, easy and cheerful, Ulania provides many amenities to give a better life and make things entertaining for the local people. People won't need to go to the main town Patarhat to lodge and withdraw their money as it's a common thing of rural areas in Bangladesh. Ulania union provides two banks in the centre of the town – Agrani Bank and Krishi Bank. There is one well equipped government owned hospital and a post-office service as well. There are two huge fields to play cricket, football, volleyball, badminton etc. New movies releases in the cinemas every month to entertain people from different levels. There are two cinemas, called Meghna Cinema Hall and Padma Cinema Hall. Swimming competition also takes place in the Ulania Dighi every year or two.

Education
There are six Coronation schools all over the country, one of which is located in the heart of the town. Some well known literate, columnist, poet, politicians were born in this union.
 College: 1 (non govt.)
 Secondary School: 3 (non govt.)
 Primary School: 10 (govt.), 10 (non govt.)
 Madrasa: 3 (non govt.)
 Kindergarten: 1 (non govt.)

Famous institutions
 Ulania Coronation High School
 Ulania Girls' High School
 Nayakhali Junior High School
 Nopaya Hogultury Hamidia Fazil Madrasah
 Ulania Ahmadia Girls' Dakhil Madrasah
 Ulania Muzaffar Khan (Degree) College
 Harni Haria Erob Sharkari Prathomik Biddaloy
 Casino Kindergarten
Library
 Pierre Elliot Trudeau Library cum Cultural Centre, Ulania

Notable residents
 Asad Chowdhury
 Abdul Gaffar Choudhury
 Atiqul Haque Chowdhury, drama producer and director

See also
 Upazilas of Bangladesh
 Districts of Bangladesh
 Divisions of Bangladesh

References

Unions of Mehendiganj Upazila